La orquesta del Titanic ("The Titanic's orchestra") is the second joint studio album by Joan Manuel Serrat and Joaquín Sabina after Dos pájaros de un tiro ("Two birds with one stone") in 2007.

The name of the album is a nod to the musicians of the RMS Titanic, as the album was released in a context of financial crisis and troubled times in different aspects of life. Sabina stated in an interview, "As Spain goes adrift, we play on, as in the Titanic."

The album's release led the two musicians to embark in their second joint tour, named Dos pájaros contraatacan ("Two birds strike back"). This tour also resulted in a live album recorded at Estadio Luna Park in Buenos Aires, Argentina, that would be released in November 2012.

Track listing
All songs written by Joan Manuel Serrat and Joaquín Sabina.

Charts

Weekly charts

Year-end charts

Certifications

References

2012 albums
Joaquín Sabina albums